Ohio, officially the State of Ohio is a state in the Midwestern United States. Of the fifty U.S. states, it is the 34th-largest by area. With a population of nearly 11.8 million, Ohio is the seventh-most populous and tenth-most densely populated state. Its capital and largest city is Columbus, with the Columbus metro area, Greater Cincinnati, and Greater Cleveland being the largest metropolitan areas. Ohio is bordered by Lake Erie to the north, Pennsylvania to the east, West Virginia to the southeast, Kentucky to the southwest, Indiana to the west, and Michigan to the northwest. Ohio is nicknamed the "Buckeye State" after its Ohio buckeye trees, and Ohioans are also known as "Buckeyes". Its state flag is the only non-rectangular flag of all the U.S. states.

Ohio takes its name from the Ohio River, which, in turn, originated from the Seneca word , meaning "good river", "great river", or "large creek". The state arose from the lands west of the Appalachian Mountains that were contested from colonial times through the Northwest Indian Wars of the late 18th century. It was partitioned from the resulting Northwest Territory, which was the first frontier of the new United States, becoming the 17th state admitted to the Union on March 1, 1803, and the first under the Northwest Ordinance. Ohio was the first post-colonial free state admitted to the union and became one of the earliest and most influential industrial powerhouses during the 20th century. Although it has transitioned to a more information- and service-based economy in the 21st century, it remains an industrial state, ranking seventh in GDP , with the third-largest manufacturing sector and second-largest automobile production.

The government of Ohio is composed of the executive branch, led by the governor; the legislative branch, consisting of the bicameral Ohio General Assembly; and the judicial branch, led by the state Supreme Court. Ohio occupies 16 seats in the United States House of Representatives. The state is known for its status as both a swing state and a bellwether in national elections. Seven presidents of the United States have come from Ohio. This has led to it receiving the moniker "the Mother of Presidents".

History

Indigenous settlement

Archeological evidence of spear points of both the Folsom and Clovis types indicate that the Ohio Valley was inhabited by nomadic people as early as 13,000 BC. These early nomads disappeared from Ohio by 1,000 BC. Between 1,000 and 800 BC, the sedentary Adena culture emerged. The Adena were able to establish "semi-permanent" villages because they domesticated plants, including sunflowers, and "grew squash and possibly corn"; with hunting and gathering, this cultivation supported more settled, complex villages. The most notable remnant of the Adena culture is the Great Serpent Mound, located in Adams County, Ohio.

Around 100 BC, the Adena evolved into the Hopewell people who were also mound builders. Their complex, large and technologically sophisticated earthworks can be found in modern-day Marietta, Newark, and Circleville. They were also a prolific trading society, their trading network spanning a third of the continent. The Hopewell disappeared from the Ohio Valley about 600 AD. The Mississippian culture rose as the Hopewell culture declined. Many Siouan-speaking peoples from the plains and east coast claim them as ancestors and say they lived throughout the Ohio region until approximately the 13th century.

There were three other cultures contemporaneous with the Mississippians: the Fort Ancient people, the Whittlesey focus people and the Monongahela Culture. All three cultures disappeared in the 17th century. Their origins are unknown. The Shawnees may have absorbed the Fort Ancient people. It is also possible that the Monongahela held no land in Ohio during the Colonial Era. The Mississippian culture was close to and traded extensively with the Fort Ancient people.

Indians in the Ohio Valley were greatly affected by the aggressive tactics of the Iroquois Confederation, based in central and western New York. After the Beaver Wars in the mid-17th century, the Iroquois claimed much of the Ohio country as hunting and, more importantly, beaver-trapping ground. After the devastation of epidemics and war in the mid-17th century, which largely emptied the Ohio country of indigenous people by the mid-to-late 17th century, the land gradually became repopulated by the mostly Algonquian. Many of these Ohio-country nations were multi-ethnic (sometimes multi-linguistic) societies born out of the earlier devastation brought about by disease, war, and subsequent social instability. They subsisted on agriculture (corn, sunflowers, beans, etc.) supplemented by seasonal hunts. By the 18th century, they were part of a larger global economy brought about by European entry into the fur trade.

Some of the indigenous nations which historically inhabited Ohio included the Iroquoian, the Algonquian and the Siouan. Ohio country was also the site of Indian massacres, such as the Yellow Creek massacre, the Gnadenhutten massacre and the Enoch Brown school massacre. After the War of 1812, when Natives suffered serious losses such as at Tippecanoe, most Native tribes either left Ohio or had to live on only limited reservations. By 1842, all remaining Natives were forced out of the state.

Colonial and Revolutionary eras

During the 18th century, the French set up a system of trading posts to control the fur trade in the region. Beginning in 1754, the Kingdom of France and Kingdom of Great Britain fought in the French and Indian War, with various Native American tribes on each side. As a result of the Treaty of Paris, the French ceded control of Ohio and the remainder of the Old Northwest to Great Britain in 1763.

Prior to the American Revolution, Britain thinly exercised sovereignty over Ohio Country by lackadaisical garrisoning of the French forts. Just beyond Ohio Country was the great Miami capital of Kekionga which became the center of British trade and influence in Ohio Country and throughout the future Northwest Territory. By the Royal Proclamation of 1763, British lands west of Appalachia were forbidden to settlement by colonists. The Treaty of Fort Stanwix in 1768 explicitly reserved lands north and west of the Ohio as Native lands. British military occupation in the region contributed to the outbreak of Pontiac's War in 1763. Ohio tribes participated in the war until an armed expedition in Ohio led by Colonel Henry Bouquet brought about a truce. Another colonial military expedition into the Ohio Country in 1774 brought Lord Dunmore's War, kicked off by the Yellow Creek massacre in Ohio, to a conclusion. In 1774, Britain passed the Quebec Act that formally annexed Ohio and other western lands to the Province of Quebec in order to provide a civil government and to centralize British administration of the Montreal-based fur trade. The prohibition of settlement west of the Appalachians remained, contributing to the American Revolution.

By the start of the American Revolutionary War, the movement of Natives and Americans between the Ohio Country and Thirteen Colonies had resulted in tension. Fort Pitt in Pennsylvania had become the main fort where expeditions into Ohio started. Intrusions into the area included General Edward Hand's 1778 movement of 500 Pennsylvania militiamen from Fort Pitt towards Mingo towns on the Cuyahoga River, where the British stored military supplies which they distributed to Indian raiding parties; Colonel Daniel Brodhead's invasion in 1780 and destruction of the Lenape Indian capital of Coshocton; a detachment of one hundred of George Rogers Clark's troops that were ambushed near the Ohio River by Indians led by Joseph Brant in the same year; a British and Native American attack on the U.S.' Fort Laurens; and the 1782 detainment and murder of 96 Moravian Lenape pacifists by Pennsylvania militiamen in the Gnadenhutten massacre.

The western theatre never had a decisive victor. In the Treaty of Paris in 1783, Britain ceded all claims to Ohio Country to the new United States after its victory in the American Revolutionary War.

Northwest Territory

The United States created the Northwest Territory under the Northwest Ordinance of 1787. Slavery was not permitted in the new territory. Settlement began with the founding of Marietta by the Ohio Company of Associates, which had been formed by a group of American Revolutionary War veterans. Following the Ohio Company, the Miami Company (also referred to as the "Symmes Purchase") claimed the southwestern section, and the Connecticut Land Company surveyed and settled the Connecticut Western Reserve in present-day Northeast Ohio. Territorial surveyors from Fort Steuben began surveying an area of eastern Ohio called the Seven Ranges at about the same time.

The old Northwest Territory originally included areas previously known as Ohio Country and Illinois Country. As Ohio prepared for statehood, the Indiana Territory was created, reducing the Northwest Territory to approximately the size of present-day Ohio plus the eastern half of the Lower Peninsula of Michigan and the eastern tip of the Upper Peninsula and a sliver of southeastern Indiana called "The Gore".

The coalition of Native American tribes, known as the Western Confederacy, was forced to cede extensive territory, including much of present-day Ohio, in the Treaty of Greenville in 1795.

Under the Northwest Ordinance, areas could be defined and admitted as states once their population reached 60,000. Although Ohio's population was only 45,000 in December 1801, Congress determined that it was growing rapidly enough and accelerated the process via the Enabling Act of 1802. In regards to the Leni Lenape natives, Congress decided that 10,000 acres on the Muskingum River in the present state of Ohio would "be set apart and the property thereof be vested in the Moravian Brethren ... or a society of the said Brethren for civilizing the Indians and promoting Christianity".

Rufus Putnam, the "Father of Ohio"

Rufus Putnam served in important military capacities in both the French and Indian War and the American Revolutionary War. He was one of the most highly respected men in the early years of the United States.

In 1776, Putnam created a method of building portable fortifications, which enabled the Continental Army to drive the British from Boston. George Washington was so impressed that he made Putnam his chief engineer. After the war, Putnam and Manasseh Cutler were instrumental in creating the Northwest Ordinance, which opened up the Northwest Territory for settlement. This land was used to serve as compensation for what was owed to Revolutionary War veterans. Putnam organized and led the Ohio Company of Associates, who settled at Marietta, Ohio, where they built a large fort called Campus Martius. He set substantial amounts of land aside for schools. In 1798, he created the plan for the construction of the Muskingum Academy (now Marietta College). In 1780, the directors of the Ohio Company appointed him superintendent of all its affairs relating to the settlement north of the Ohio River. In 1796, he was commissioned by President George Washington as Surveyor-General of United States Lands. In 1788, he served as a judge in the Northwest Territory's first court. In 1802, he served in the convention to form a constitution for the State of Ohio.

Statehood and early years

On February 19, 1803, U.S. President Thomas Jefferson signed an act of Congress that approved Ohio's boundaries and constitution. However, Congress had never passed a formal resolution admitting Ohio as the 17th state. Although no formal resolution of admission was required, when the oversight was discovered in 1953, as Ohio began preparations for celebrating its sesquicentennial, Ohio congressman George H. Bender introduced a bill in Congress to admit Ohio to the Union retroactive to March 1, 1803, the date on which the Ohio General Assembly first convened. At a special session at the old state capital in Chillicothe, the Ohio state legislature approved a new petition for statehood which was delivered to Washington, D.C., on horseback, and approved that August.

Ohio has had three capital cities: Chillicothe, Zanesville, and Columbus. Chillicothe was the capital from 1803 to 1810. The capital was then moved to Zanesville for two years, as part of a state legislative compromise to get a bill passed. The capital was then moved back to Chillicothe, which was the capital from 1812 to 1816. Finally, the capital was moved to Columbus, to have it near the geographic center of the state.

Although many Native Americans had migrated west to evade American encroachment, others remained settled in the state, sometimes assimilating in part. Starting around 1809, the Shawnee pressed resistance to encroachment again. Under Chief Tecumseh, Tecumseh's War officially began in Ohio in 1811. When the War of 1812 began, the British decided to attack from Upper Canada into Ohio and merge their forces with the Shawnee. This continued until Tecumseh was killed at the Battle of the Thames in 1813. Most of the Shawnee, excluding the Pekowi in Southwest Ohio, were forcibly relocated west. Ohio played a key role in the War of 1812, as it was on the front line in the Western theater and the scene of several notable battles both on land and in Lake Erie. On September 10, 1813, the Battle of Lake Erie, one of the major battles, took place near Put-in-Bay, Ohio. The British eventually surrendered to Oliver Hazard Perry.

Ultimately, after the United States government used the Indian Removal Act of 1830 to force countless Native American tribes on the Trail of Tears, where all the southern states except for Florida were successfully emptied of Native peoples, the US government panicked because a majority of tribes did not want to be forced out of their own lands. Fearing further wars between Native tribes and American settlers, they pushed all remaining Native tribes in the East to migrate west against their own will, including all remaining tribes in Ohio.

In 1835, Ohio fought with the Michigan Territory in the Toledo War, a mostly bloodless boundary war over the Toledo Strip. Only one person was injured in the conflict. Congress intervened, making Michigan's admittance as a state conditional on ending the conflict. In exchange for giving up its claim to the Toledo Strip, Michigan was given the western two-thirds of the Upper Peninsula, in addition to the eastern third which was already considered part of the territory.

Civil War and industrialization

Ohio's central position and its population gave it an important place during the Civil War. The Ohio River was a vital artery for troop and supply movements, as were Ohio's railroads. The industry of Ohio made the state one of the most important states in the Union during the Civil War. Ohio contributed more soldiers per capita than any other state in the Union. In 1862, the state's morale was badly shaken in the aftermath of the Battle of Shiloh, a costly victory in which Ohio forces suffered 2,000 casualties. Later that year, when Confederate troops under the leadership of Stonewall Jackson threatened Washington, D.C., Ohio governor David Tod still could recruit 5,000 volunteers to provide three months of service. From July 13 to 26, 1863, towns along the Ohio River were attacked and ransacked in Morgan's Raid, starting in Harrison in the west and culminating in the Battle of Salineville near West Point in the far east. While this raid was overall insignificant to the Confederacy, it aroused fear among people in Ohio and Indiana as it was the furthest advancement of troops from the South in the war. Almost 35,000 Ohioans died in the conflict, and 30,000 were physically wounded. By the end of the Civil War, the Union's top three generals – Ulysses S. Grant, William Tecumseh Sherman, and Philip Sheridan – were all from Ohio.

Throughout much of the 19th century, industry was rapidly introduced to complement an existing agricultural economy. One of the first iron manufacturing plants opened near Youngstown in 1804, called Hopewell Furnace. By the mid-19th century, 48 blast furnaces were operating in the state, most in the southern portions of the state. Discovery of coal deposits aided the further development of the steel industry in the state, and by 1853 Cleveland was the third largest iron and steel producer in the country. The first Bessemer converter was purchased by the Cleveland Rolling Mill Company, which eventually became part of the U.S. Steel Corporation following the merger of Federal Steel Company and Carnegie Steel, the first billion-dollar American corporation. The first open-hearth furnace used for steel production was constructed by the Otis Steel Company in Cleveland, and by 1892, Ohio ranked as the second-largest steel-producing state behind Pennsylvania. Republic Steel was founded in Youngstown in 1899 and was at one point the nation's third-largest producer. Armco, now AK Steel, was founded in Middletown also in 1899.

20th century
The state legislature officially adopted the flag of Ohio on May 9, 1902. Dayton natives Orville and Wilbur Wright made four brief flights at Kitty Hawk, North Carolina on December 17, 1903, inventing the first successful airplane. Ohio was hit by its greatest natural disaster in the Great Flood of 1913, resulting in at least 428 fatalities and hundreds of millions of dollars in property damage, particularly around the Great Miami River basin.

The National Football League was originally founded in Canton, Ohio in 1920 as the American Professional Football Conference. It included Ohio League teams in five Ohio cities (Akron, Canton, Cleveland, Columbus, and Dayton), although none of these teams still exist. The first official game occurred on October 3, 1920, when the Dayton Triangles beat the Columbus Panhandles 14-0 in Dayton. Canton would later be enshrined as the home of the Pro Football Hall of Fame in 1963.

During the 1930s, the Great Depression struck the state hard. By 1933, more than 40% of factory workers and 67% of construction workers were unemployed in Ohio. Approximately 50% of industrial workers in Cleveland and 80% in Toledo became unemployed, with the state unemployment rate reaching a high of 37.3%. American Jews watched the rise of Nazi Germany with apprehension. Cleveland residents Jerry Siegel and Joe Shuster created the Superman comic character in the spirit of the Jewish golem. Many of their comics portrayed Superman fighting and defeating the Nazis. Approximately 839,000 Ohioans served in the U.S. armed forces during World War II, of which over 23,000 died or were missing in action.

Artists, writers, musicians and actors developed in the state throughout the 20th century and often moved to other cities which were larger centers for their work. They included Zane Grey, Milton Caniff, George Bellows, Art Tatum, Roy Lichtenstein, and Roy Rogers. Alan Freed, who emerged from the swing dance culture in Cleveland, hosted the first live rock 'n roll concert in Cleveland in 1952. Famous filmmakers include Steven Spielberg, Chris Columbus and the original Warner Brothers, who set up their first movie theatre in Youngstown before that company later relocated to California. The state produced many popular musicians, including Dean Martin, Doris Day, The O'Jays, Marilyn Manson, Dave Grohl, Devo, Macy Gray and The Isley Brothers.

Two Ohio astronauts completed significant milestones in the space race in the 1960s: John Glenn becoming the first American to orbit the Earth, and Neil Armstrong becoming the first human to walk on the Moon. In 1967, Carl Stokes was elected mayor of Cleveland and became the first African American mayor of one of the nation's 10 most populous cities.

In 1970, an Ohio Army National Guard unit fired at students during an anti-war protest at Kent State University, killing four and wounding nine. The Guard had been called onto campus after several protests in and around campus had become violent, including a riot in downtown Kent and the burning of an ROTC building. The main cause of the protests was the United States' invasion of Cambodia during the Vietnam War.

Beginning in the 1980s, the state entered into international economic and resource cooperation treaties and organizations with other Midwestern states, as well as New York, Pennsylvania, Ontario, and Quebec, including the Great Lakes Charter, Great Lakes Compact, and the Council of Great Lakes Governors.

21st century
Ohio's economy has undergone significant change in the 21st century, as the trend of deindustrialization has greatly impacted the American Midwest and the Rust Belt. Manufacturing in the Midwest experienced a stark decline during the early 21st century, a trend which greatly impacted Ohio. From 1990 to 2019, Ohio lost over 300,000 manufacturing jobs, but added over 1,000,000 non-manufacturing jobs during that same time. Coinciding with this decline, Ohio has seen a large decline in union membership: 17.4% of Ohioan workers were union members in 2000, while 12.8% were union members in 2022.

In the wake of these economic changes, Ohio's state government has looked to promoting new industries to offset manufacturing losses, such as the production of solar energy and electric vehicles. One major program launched by the state's government was the "Third Frontier" program, created during the governorship of Bob Taft, which aims to increase investment in Ohio, and boost the state's technology sector. As of 2010, the Ohio Department of Development attributes the creation of 9,500 jobs to this program, with an average of salary of $65,000, while having a $6.6 billion economic impact with a return on investment of 9:1. In 2010 the state won the International Economic Development Council's Excellence in Economic Development Award, celebrated as a national model of success.

Many of the state's former industrial centers turned to new industries, including Akron as a center for polymer and biomedical research, Cincinnati as the state's largest mercantile hub, Columbus as a center for technological research and development, education, and insurance, Cleveland in regenerative medicine research and manufacturing, Dayton as an aerospace and defense hub, and Toledo as a national center for solar technology.

Ohio's economy was also heavily afflicted by the Great Recession, as the state's unemployment rate rose from 5.6% in the first two months of 2008 up to a peak of 11.1% in December 2009 and January 2010. It took until August 2014 for the unemployment rate to return to 5.6%. From December 2007 to September 2010, Ohio lost 376,500 jobs. In 2009, Ohio had 89,053 foreclosures filings, a then-record for the state. The median household income dropped 7% from 2006-2007 to 2008-200, and the poverty rate ballooned to 13.5% by 2009.

In 2015, Ohio gross domestic product was $608.1 billion, the seventh-largest economy among the 50 states. In 2015, Ohio's total GDP accounted for 3.4% of U.S. GDP and 0.8% of world GDP.

Politically, Ohio has been long regarded as a swing state, however, the success of many Republican Party candidates in Ohio since the late 2000s has led many to question whether Ohio remains an electoral battleground.

On March 9, 2020, the Covid-19 pandemic was confirmed to reach Ohio, with three cases being reported. As of February 2023, over 41,600 Ohioans have died from Covid-19. Ohio's economy was also heavily impacted by the pandemic, as the state saw large job losses in 2020, as well as large amounts of subsequent stimulus spending.

Geography

Ohio's geographic location has proven to be an asset for economic growth and expansion. Because Ohio links the Northeast to the Midwest, much cargo and business traffic passes through its borders along its well-developed highways. Ohio has the nation's 10th largest highway network and is within a one-day drive of 50% of North America's population and 70% of North America's manufacturing capacity. To the north, Ohio has  of coastline with Lake Erie, which allows for numerous cargo ports such as Cleveland and Toledo. Ohio's southern border is defined by the Ohio River. Ohio's neighbors are Pennsylvania to the east, Michigan to the northwest, Lake Erie to the north, Indiana to the west, Kentucky on the south, and West Virginia on the southeast. Ohio's borders were defined by metes and bounds in the Enabling Act of 1802 as follows:

Ohio is bounded by the Ohio River, but nearly all of the river itself belongs to Kentucky and West Virginia. In 1980, the U.S. Supreme Court held that, based on the wording of the cessation of territory by Virginia (which at the time included what is now Kentucky and West Virginia), the boundary between Ohio and Kentucky (and, by implication, West Virginia) is the northern low-water mark of the river as it existed in 1792. Ohio has only that portion of the river between the river's 1792 low-water mark and the present high-water mark.

The border with Michigan has also changed, as a result of the Toledo War, to angle slightly northeast to the north shore of the mouth of the Maumee River.

Much of Ohio features glaciated till plains, with an exceptionally flat area in the northwest being known as the Great Black Swamp. This glaciated region in the northwest and central state is bordered to the east and southeast first by a belt known as the glaciated Allegheny Plateau, and then by another belt known as the unglaciated Allegheny Plateau. Most of Ohio is of low relief, but the unglaciated Allegheny Plateau features rugged hills and forests.

The rugged southeastern quadrant of Ohio, stretching in an outward bow-like arc along the Ohio River from the West Virginia Panhandle to the outskirts of Cincinnati, forms a distinct socio-economic unit. Geologically similar to parts of West Virginia and southwestern Pennsylvania, this area's coal mining legacy, dependence on small pockets of old manufacturing establishments, and distinctive regional dialect set this section off from the rest of the state. In 1965 the United States Congress passed the Appalachian Regional Development Act, an attempt to "address the persistent poverty and growing economic despair of the Appalachian Region". This act defines 29 Ohio counties as part of Appalachia. While 1/3 of Ohio's land mass is part of the federally defined Appalachian region, only 12.8% of Ohioans live there (1.476 million people.)

Significant rivers within the state include the Cuyahoga River, Great Miami River, Maumee River, Muskingum River, and Scioto River. The rivers in the northern part of the state drain into the northern Atlantic Ocean via Lake Erie and the St. Lawrence River, and the rivers in the southern part of the state drain into the Gulf of Mexico via the Ohio River and then the Mississippi.

The worst weather disaster in Ohio history occurred along the Great Miami River in 1913. Known as the Great Dayton Flood, the entire Miami River watershed flooded, including the downtown business district of Dayton. As a result, the Miami Conservancy District was created as the first major floodplain engineering project in Ohio and the United States.

Grand Lake St. Marys in the west-central part of the state was constructed as a supply of water for canals in the canal-building era of 1820–1850. Ohio's canal-building projects were not the economic fiasco that similar efforts were in other states. Some cities, such as Dayton, owe their industrial emergence to their location on canals, and as late as 1910 interior canals carried much of the bulk freight of the state.

Climate

The climate of Ohio is a humid continental climate (Köppen climate classification Dfa/Dfb) throughout most of the state, except in the extreme southern counties of Ohio's Bluegrass region section, which are located on the northern periphery of the humid subtropical climate (Cfa) and Upland South region of the United States. Summers are typically hot and humid throughout the state, while winters generally range from cool to cold. Precipitation in Ohio is moderate year-round. Severe weather is not uncommon in the state, although there are typically fewer tornado reports in Ohio than in states located in what is known as the Tornado Alley. Severe lake effect snowstorms are also not uncommon on the southeast shore of Lake Erie, which is located in an area designated as the Snowbelt.

Although predominantly not in a subtropical climate, some warmer-climate flora and fauna do reach well into Ohio. For instance, some trees with more southern ranges, such as the blackjack oak, Quercus marilandica, are found at their northernmost in Ohio just north of the Ohio River. Also evidencing this climatic transition from a subtropical to a continental climate, several plants such as the Southern magnolia (Magnolia grandiflora), Albizia julibrissin (mimosa), Crape Myrtle, and even the occasional Needle Palm are hardy landscape materials regularly used as street, yard, and garden plantings in the Bluegrass region of Ohio; but these same plants will simply not thrive in much of the rest of the state. This interesting change may be observed while traveling through Ohio on Interstate 75 from Cincinnati to Toledo; the observant traveler of this diverse state may even catch a glimpse of Cincinnati's common wall lizard, one of the few examples of permanent "subtropical" fauna in Ohio.

Records

Earthquakes
Although few have registered as noticeable to the average resident, more than 200 earthquakes with a magnitude of 2.0 or higher have occurred in Ohio since 1776. The Western Ohio Seismic Zone and a portion of the Southern Great Lakes Seismic Zone are located in the state, and numerous faults lie under the surface.

The most substantial known earthquake in Ohio history was the Anna (Shelby County) earthquake, which occurred on March 9, 1937. It was centered in western Ohio, with a magnitude of 5.4, and was of intensity VIII.

Other significant earthquakes in Ohio include: one of magnitude 4.8 near Lima on September 19, 1884; one of magnitude 4.2 near Portsmouth on May 17, 1901; and one of 5.0 in LeRoy Township in Lake County on January 31, 1986, which continued to trigger 13 aftershocks of magnitude 0.5 to 2.4 for two months.

Major cities

Ohio's three largest cities are Columbus, Cleveland, and Cincinnati, all three of which anchor major metropolitan areas. Columbus is the capital of the state, located near its geographic center and is well known for Ohio State University. In 2019, the city had six corporations named to the U.S. Fortune 500 list: Alliance Data, Nationwide Mutual Insurance Company, American Electric Power, L Brands, Huntington Bancshares, and Cardinal Health in suburban Dublin. Other major employers include hospitals (among others, Wexner Medical Center and Nationwide Children's Hospital), high tech research and development including the Battelle Memorial Institute, information-based companies such as OCLC and Chemical Abstracts Service, manufacturer Worthington Industries, and financial institutions such as JPMorgan Chase and Huntington Bancshares. Fast food chains Wendy's and White Castle are also headquartered in Columbus.

Located in Northeast Ohio along the Lake Erie shore, Cleveland is characterized by its New England heritage, ethnic immigrant cultures, and history as a major American manufacturing and healthcare center. It anchors the Cleveland–Akron–Canton Combined Statistical Area, of which the cities of Akron and Canton are constituent parts. Mansfield and Youngstown are also major cities in the region. Northeast Ohio is known for major industrial companies Goodyear Tire and Rubber and Timken, top-ranked colleges Case Western Reserve University, Oberlin College, and Kent State University, the Cleveland Clinic, and cultural attractions including the Cleveland Museum of Art, Big Five member Cleveland Orchestra, Cuyahoga Valley National Park, Playhouse Square, the Pro Football Hall of Fame, and the Rock and Roll Hall of Fame.

Cincinnati anchors Southwest Ohio and the Cincinnati Tri-State area, which also encompasses counties in the neighboring states of Kentucky and Indiana. The metropolitan area is home to Miami University and the University of Cincinnati, Cincinnati Union Terminal, Cincinnati Symphony Orchestra, and various Fortune 500 companies including Procter & Gamble, Kroger, Macy's, Inc., and Fifth Third Bank. Dayton and Springfield are located in the Miami Valley, which is home to the University of Dayton, the Dayton Ballet, and the extensive Wright-Patterson Air Force Base.

Toledo and Lima are the major cities in Northwest Ohio, an area known for its glass-making industry. It is home to Owens Corning and Owens-Illinois, two Fortune 500 corporations. Steubenville is the only metropolitan city in Appalachian Ohio, a region known for its mixed mesophytic forests.

Metropolitan areas

The Cincinnati metropolitan area extends into Kentucky and Indiana, the Steubenville metropolitan area extends into West Virginia, and the Youngstown metropolitan area extends into Pennsylvania.

Other metropolitan areas that contain cities in Ohio, but are primarily in other states include:
 Huntington-Ashland, WV-KY-OH Metropolitan Statistical Area (Lawrence County)
 Wheeling, WV-OH Metropolitan Statistical Area (Belmont County)

Additionally, 30 Ohio cities function as centers of micropolitan areas, urban clusters smaller than that of metropolitan areas. Many of these are included as part of larger combined statistical areas, as shown in the table above.

Demographics

Population
From just over 45,000 residents in 1800, Ohio's population grew faster than 10% per decade (except for the 1940 census) until the 1970 census, which recorded just over 10.65 million Ohioans. Growth then slowed for the next four decades. The United States Census Bureau counted 11,808,848 in the 2020 census, a 2.4% increase since the 2010 United States census. Ohio's population growth lags that of the entire United States, and whites are found in a greater density than the US average. , Ohio's center of population is located in Morrow County, in the county seat of Mount Gilead.

As of 2011, 27.6% of Ohio's children under the age of 1 belonged to minority groups.
6.2% of Ohio's population is under five years of age, 23.7 percent under 18 years of age, and 14.1 percent were 65 or older. Females made up approximately 51.2 percent of the population.

According to HUD's 2022 Annual Homeless Assessment Report, there were an estimated 10,654 homeless people in Ohio.

Birth data
Note: Births in table do not add up because Hispanics are counted both by their ethnicity and by their race, giving a higher overall number.

 Since 2016, data for births of White Hispanic origin are not collected, but included in one Hispanic group; persons of Hispanic origin may be of any race.

Ancestry

In 2010, there were 469,700 foreign-born residents in Ohio, corresponding to 4.1% of the total population. Of these, 229,049 (2.0%) were naturalized US citizens and 240,699 (2.1%) were not. The largest groups were: Mexico (54,166), India (50,256), China (34,901), Germany (19,219), Philippines (16,410), United Kingdom (15,917), Canada (14,223), Russia (11,763), South Korea (11,307), and Ukraine (10,681). Though predominantly white, Ohio has large black populations in all major metropolitan areas throughout the state, Ohio has a significant Hispanic population made up of Mexicans in Toledo and Columbus, and Puerto Ricans in Cleveland and Columbus, and also has a significant and diverse Asian population in Columbus.

Ancestry groups (which the census defines as not including racial terms) in the state are:
 26.5% German
 14.1% Irish
 9.0% English
 6.4% Italian
 3.8% Polish
 2.5% French
 1.9% Scottish
 1.7% Hungarian
 1.6% Dutch
 1.5% Mexican
 1.2% Slovak
 1.1% Welsh
 1.1% Scotch-Irish

Ancestries claimed by less than 1% of the population include Sub-Saharan African, Puerto Rican, Swiss, Swedish, Arab, Greek, Norwegian, Romanian, Austrian, Lithuanian, Finnish, West Indian, Portuguese and Slovene.

Languages

About 6.7% of the population age 5 years and older reported speaking a language other than English, with 2.2% of the population speaking Spanish, 2.6% speaking other Indo-European languages, 1.1% speaking Asian and Austronesian languages, and 0.8% speaking other languages. Numerically: 10,100,586 spoke English, 239,229 Spanish, 55,970 German, 38,990 Chinese, 33,125 Arabic, and 32,019 French. In addition, 59,881 spoke a Slavic language and 42,673 spoke another West Germanic language according to the 2010 census. Ohio also had the nation's largest population of Slovene speakers, second largest of Slovak speakers, second largest of Pennsylvania Dutch (German) speakers, and the third largest of Serbian speakers.

Religion

According to a Pew Forum poll, as of 2014, 73% of Ohioans identified as Christian. Specifically, 29% of Ohio's population identified as Evangelical Protestant, 17% as Mainline Protestant, 7% as Historically Black Protestant, and 18% as Catholic. 22% of the population is unaffiliated with any religious body. Small minorities of Jews (1%), Jehovah's Witnesses (1%), Muslims (1%), Hindus (<1%), Buddhists (1%), Mormons (1%), and other faiths (1-1.5%) exist.

According to the Association of Religion Data Archives (ARDA), in 2010 the largest denominations by adherents were the Catholic Church with 1,992,567; the United Methodist Church with 496,232; the Evangelical Lutheran Church in America with 223,253, the Southern Baptist Convention with 171,000, the Christian Churches and Churches of Christ with 141,311, the United Church of Christ with 118,000, and the Presbyterian Church (USA) with 110,000. With about 80,000 adherents in 2020, Ohio has the second largest Amish population of all U.S. states, only behind neighboring Pennsylvania.

According to the same data, a majority of Ohioans, 56%, feel religion is "very important", 25% that it is "somewhat important", and 19% that religion is "not too important/not important at all". 38% of Ohioans indicate that they attend religious services at least once weekly, 32% occasionally, and 30% seldom or never.

Economy

According to the U.S. Census Bureau, the total number of people employed in 2016 was 4,790,178. The total number of unique employer establishments was 252,201, while the total number of non-employer establishments was 785,833. In 2010, Ohio was ranked second in the country for best business climate by Site Selection magazine, based on a business-activity database. The state has also won three consecutive Governor's Cup awards from the magazine, based on business growth and developments. , Ohio's gross domestic product (GDP) was $626 billion. This ranks Ohio's economy as the seventh-largest of all fifty states and the District of Columbia.

The Small Business & Entrepreneurship Council ranked the state No. 10 for best business-friendly tax systems in their Business Tax Index 2009, including a top corporate tax and capital gains rate that were both ranked No. 6 at 1.9%. Ohio was ranked No. 11 by the council for best friendly-policy states according to their Small Business Survival Index 2009. The Directorship's Boardroom Guide ranked the state No. 13 overall for best business climate, including No. 7 for best litigation climate. Forbes ranked the state No. 8 for best regulatory environment in 2009. Ohio has five of the top 115 colleges in the nation, according to U.S. News & World Reports 2010 rankings, and was ranked No. 8 by the same magazine in 2008 for best high schools.

Ohio's unemployment rate stands at 4.5% as of February 2018, down from 10.7% in May 2010. The state still lacks 45,000 jobs compared to the pre-recession numbers of 2007. The labor force participation as of April 2015 is 63%, slightly above the national average. Ohio's per capita income stands at $34,874. , Ohio's median household income is $58,642, and 13.1% of the population is below the poverty line.

The manufacturing and financial activities sectors each compose 18.3% of Ohio's GDP, making them Ohio's largest industries by percentage of GDP. Ohio has the third largest manufacturing workforce behind California and Texas. Ohio has the largest bioscience sector in the Midwest, and is a national leader in the "green" economy. Ohio is the largest producer in the country of plastics, rubber, fabricated metals, electrical equipment, and appliances. 5,212,000 Ohioans are currently employed by wage or salary.

By employment, Ohio's largest sector is trade/transportation/utilities, which employs 1,010,000 Ohioans, or 19.4% of Ohio's workforce, while the health care and education sector employs 825,000 Ohioans (15.8%). Government employs 787,000 Ohioans (15.1%), manufacturing employs 669,000 Ohioans (12.9%), and professional and technical services employs 638,000 Ohioans (12.2%). Ohio's manufacturing sector is the third-largest of all fifty United States states in terms of gross domestic product. Fifty-nine of the United States' top 1,000 publicly traded companies (by revenue in 2008) are headquartered in Ohio, including Procter & Gamble, Goodyear Tire & Rubber, AK Steel, Timken, Abercrombie & Fitch, and Wendy's.

Ohio is also one of 41 states with its own lottery, the Ohio Lottery. , the Ohio Lottery has contributed more than $26 billion to education beginning in 1974.

Transportation

Roads

Many major east–west transportation corridors go through Ohio. One of those pioneer routes, known in the early 20th century as "Main Market Route 3", was chosen in 1913 to become part of the historic Lincoln Highway which was the first road across America, connecting New York City to San Francisco. In Ohio, the Lincoln Highway linked many towns and cities together, including Canton, Mansfield, Wooster, Lima, and Van Wert. The arrival of the Lincoln Highway to Ohio was a major influence on the development of the state. Upon the advent of the federal numbered highway system in 1926, the Lincoln Highway through Ohio became U.S. Route 30.

Ohio has a highly developed network of roads and interstate highways. Major east-west through routes include the Ohio Turnpike (I-80/I-90) in the north, I-76 through Akron to Pennsylvania, I-70 through Columbus and Dayton, and the Appalachian Highway (State Route 32) running from West Virginia to Cincinnati. Major north–south routes include I-75 in the west through Toledo, Dayton, and Cincinnati, I-71 through the middle of the state from Cleveland through Columbus and Cincinnati into Kentucky, and I-77 in the eastern part of the state from Cleveland through Akron, Canton, New Philadelphia and Marietta south into West Virginia. Interstate 75 between Cincinnati and Dayton is one of the heaviest traveled sections of interstate in Ohio.

Trails

Ohio also has a highly developed network of signed state bicycle routes. Many of them follow rail trails, with conversion ongoing. The Ohio to Erie Trail (route 1) connects Cincinnati, Columbus, and Cleveland. U.S. Bicycle Route 50 traverses Ohio from Steubenville to the Indiana state line outside Richmond.

Ohio has several long-distance hiking trails, the most prominent of which is the Buckeye Trail which extends  in a loop around the state of Ohio. Part of it is on roads and part is on wooded trail. Additionally, the North Country Trail (the longest of the eleven National Scenic Trails authorized by Congress) and the American Discovery Trail (a system of recreational trails and roads that collectively form a coast-to-coast route across the mid-tier of the United States) pass through Ohio. Much of these two trails coincide with the Buckeye Trail.

Rail

Ohio has an extensive rail network, though today most lines carry only freight traffic. Three Class I freight railroads operate in Ohio: CSX Transportation, Norfolk Southern Railway, and Canadian National Railway. Many local freight carriers also exist in the state.

Amtrak, the national passenger railroad, operates three long-distance rail routes through Ohio. The Cardinal serves Cincinnati Union Terminal.

Columbus is the largest city in the United States without any form of passenger rail. Its Union Station was last served in 1979 by the National Limited.

Ohio is home to several scenic railways and museums, including the Cuyahoga Valley Scenic Railroad through Cuyahoga Valley National Park, the Age of Steam Roundhouse museum, and the Hocking Valley Scenic Railway near Hocking Hills State Park.

Transit

Mass transit exists in many forms in Ohio cities, primarily through bus systems. The Greater Cleveland Regional Transit Authority (GCRTA) operates the RTA Rapid Transit system, which consists of one heavy rail line, three light rail lines, and three bus rapid transit lines. Cincinnati is served by the Southwest Ohio Regional Transit Authority (SORTA) bus network as well as a  streetcar line, the Cincinnati Bell Connector. Other major transit agencies in Ohio include the Central Ohio Transit Authority (COTA) serving Columbus and the Greater Dayton Regional Transit Authority (GDRTA) serving Dayton.

Air travel

Ohio has four international airports, four commercial, and two military. The four international include Cleveland Hopkins International Airport, John Glenn Columbus International Airport, Dayton International Airport, and Rickenbacker International Airport (one of two military airfields). The other military airfield is Wright Patterson Air Force Base which is one of the largest Air Force bases in the United States. Other major airports are located in Toledo and Akron. Cincinnati's primary airport, Cincinnati/Northern Kentucky International Airport, is in Hebron, Kentucky, and therefore is not included in Ohio airport lists.

Waterways

Law and government

The state government of Ohio consists of the executive, legislative, and judicial branches.

Executive branch
The executive branch is headed by the governor of Ohio. The current governor is Mike DeWine since 2019, a member of the Republican Party. A lieutenant governor succeeds the governor in the event of any removal from office, and performs any duties assigned by the governor. The current lieutenant governor is Jon Husted. The other elected constitutional offices in the executive branch are the secretary of state (Frank LaRose), auditor (Keith Faber), treasurer (Robert Sprague), and attorney general (Dave Yost). There are 21 state administrative departments in the executive branch.

Legislative branch

The Ohio General Assembly is a bicameral legislature consisting of the Senate and House of Representatives. The Senate is composed of 33 districts, each of which is represented by one senator. Each senator represents approximately 330,000 constituents. The House of Representatives is composed of 99 members. The Republican Party is the controlling party in both houses as of the 2020 election cycle.

In order to be enacted into law, a bill must be adopted by both houses of the General Assembly and signed by the Governor. If the Governor vetoes a bill, the General Assembly can override the veto with a three-fifths supermajority of both houses. A bill will also become a law if the Governor fails to sign or veto it within 10 days of its being presented. The session laws are published in the official Law of Ohio. These in turn have been codified in the Ohio Revised Code.

The General Assembly, with the approval of the Governor, draws the U.S. congressional district lines for Ohio's 16 seats in the United States House of Representatives. The Ohio Apportionment Board draws state legislative district lines in Ohio.

Judicial branch

There are three levels of the Ohio state judiciary. The lowest level is the court of common pleas: each county maintains its own constitutionally mandated court of common pleas, which maintain jurisdiction over "all justiciable matters". The intermediate-level court system is the district court system. Twelve courts of appeals exist, each retaining jurisdiction over appeals from common pleas, municipal, and county courts in a set geographical area. A case heard in this system is decided by a three-judge panel, and each judge is elected.

The state's highest-ranking court is the Ohio Supreme Court. A seven-justice panel composes the court, which, by its own discretion, hears appeals from the courts of appeals, and retains original jurisdiction over limited matters.

Local government

There are also several levels of local government in Ohio: counties, municipalities (cities and villages), townships, special districts and school districts.

Ohio is divided into 88 counties. Ohio law defines a structure for county government, although they may adopt charters for home rule. Summit County and Cuyahoga County have chosen an alternate form of government. The other counties have a government with a three-member board of county commissioners, a sheriff, coroner, auditor, treasurer, clerk of the court of common pleas prosecutor, engineer, and recorder.

There are two kinds of incorporated municipalities, 251 cities and 681 villages. If a municipality has five thousand or more residents as of the last United States Census it is a city, otherwise it is a village. Municipalities have full home rule powers, may adopt a charter, ordinances and resolutions for self-government. Each municipality chooses its own form of government, but most have elected mayors and city councils or city commissions. City governments provide much more extensive services than county governments, such as police forces and paid (as opposed to volunteer) fire departments.

The entire area of the state is encompassed by townships. When the boundaries of a township are coterminous with the boundaries of a city or village, the township ceases to exist as a separate government (called a paper township). Townships are governed by a three-member board of township trustees. Townships may have limited home rule powers.

There are more than 600 city, local, and exempted village school districts providing K-12 education in Ohio, as well as about four dozen joint vocation school districts which are separate from the K-12 districts. Each city school district, local school district, or exempted village school district is governed by an elected board of education. A school district previously under state supervision (municipal school district) may be governed by a board whose members either are elected or appointed by the mayor of the municipality containing the greatest portion of the district's area.

Politics

"Mother of presidents"
Six U.S. presidents hailed from Ohio at the time of their elections, giving rise to its nickname "mother of presidents", a sobriquet it shares with Virginia. It is also termed "modern mother of presidents", in contrast to Virginia's status as the origin of presidents earlier in American history. Seven presidents were born in Ohio, making it second to Virginia's eight. Virginia-born William Henry Harrison lived most of his life in Ohio and is also buried there. Harrison conducted his political career while living on the family compound, founded by his father-in-law, John Cleves Symmes, in North Bend, Ohio. The seven presidents born in Ohio were Ulysses S. Grant (elected from Illinois), Rutherford B. Hayes, James A. Garfield, Benjamin Harrison (grandson of William Henry Harrison & elected from Indiana), William McKinley, William Howard Taft and Warren G. Harding. All seven were Republicans.

Electoral history

Ohio is considered a swing state, being won by either the Democratic or Republican candidates reasonably each election. As a swing state, Ohio is usually targeted by both major-party campaigns, especially in competitive elections. Pivotal in the election of 1888, Ohio has been a regular swing state since 1980 and has been considered a bellwether. This status, however, was called into question after incumbent Republican Donald Trump won the state by a comfortable eight-point margin in the 2020 presidential election despite losing nationally to Democratic challenger  Joe Biden.

Historian R. Douglas Hurt asserts that not since Virginia "had a state made such a mark on national political affairs". The Economist notes that "This slice of the mid-west contains a bit of everything American—part north-eastern and part southern, part urban and part rural, part hardscrabble poverty and part booming suburb". Since 1896, Ohio has had only three misses in the general election (Thomas E. Dewey in 1944, Richard Nixon in 1960, and Donald Trump in 2020) and had the longest perfect streak of any state, voting for the winning presidential candidate in each election from 1964 to 2016, and in 33 of the 38 held since the Civil War. No Republican has ever won the presidency without winning Ohio.

As of 2019, there are more than 7.8 million registered Ohioan voters, with 1.3 million Democrats and 1.9 million Republicans. They are disproportionate in age, with a million more over 65 than there are 18- to 24-year-olds. Since the 2010 midterm elections, Ohio's voter demographic has leaned towards the Republican Party. The governor, Mike DeWine, is Republican, as are all other non-judicial statewide elected officials, including Lieutenant Governor Jon A. Husted, Attorney General Dave Yost, State Auditor Keith Faber, Secretary of State Frank LaRose and State Treasurer Robert Sprague. In the Ohio State Senate the Republicans are the majority, 25–8, and in the Ohio House of Representatives the Republicans control the delegation 64–35.

Losing one seat in the U.S. House of Representatives following the 2020 census, Ohio will have 15 seats for the two presidential elections of the decade in 2024 and 2028. As of the 2022 cycle, ten federal representatives are Republicans while five are Democrats. Marcy Kaptur (D-09) is the most senior member of the Ohio delegation to the U.S. House of Representatives. The senior U.S. senator, Sherrod Brown, is a Democrat, while the junior, J. D. Vance, is a Republican.

Allegations of voter suppression 

Since 1994, the state has had a policy of purging infrequent voters from its rolls. In April 2016, a lawsuit was filed, challenging this policy on the grounds that it violated the National Voter Registration Act (NVRA) of 1993 and the Help America Vote Act of 2002. In June, the federal district court ruled for the plaintiffs and entered a preliminary injunction applicable only to the November 2016 election. The preliminary injunction was upheld in September by the Court of Appeals for the Sixth Circuit. Had it not been upheld, thousands of voters would have been purged from the rolls just a few weeks before the election.

Still, it has been estimated that the state has removed up to two million voters since 2011.

In a 2020 study, Ohio was ranked as the 17th hardest state for citizens to vote in.

Education

Ohio's system of public education is outlined in Article VI of the state constitution, and in Title XXXIII of the Ohio Revised Code. Ohio University, the first university in the Northwest Territory, was also the first public institution in Ohio. Substantively, Ohio's system is similar to those found in other states. At the State level, the Ohio Department of Education, which is overseen by the Ohio State Board of Education, governs primary and secondary educational institutions. At the municipal level, there are approximately 700 school districts statewide. The Ohio Board of Regents coordinates and assists with Ohio's institutions of higher education which have recently been reorganized into the University System of Ohio under Governor Strickland. The system averages an annual enrollment of more than 400,000 students, making it one of the five largest state university systems in the U.S.

Colleges and universities

Ohio schools consistently ranking in the top 50 nationally of the U.S. News & World Report of liberal arts colleges are Ohio Big Three; Denison University, Oberlin College, and Kenyon College. Ranking in the top 100 of national research universities typically includes Case Western Reserve University, Ohio State University and Miami University.

 13 state universities
 Bowling Green State University (Bowling Green)
 Central State University (Wilberforce)
 Cleveland State University (Cleveland)
 Kent State University (Kent)
 Miami University (Oxford)
  Ohio State University, (Columbus)
 Ohio University (Athens)
 Shawnee State University (Portsmouth)
 University of Akron (Akron)
 University of Cincinnati (Cincinnati)
 University of Toledo (Toledo)
 Wright State University (Dayton)
 Youngstown State University (Youngstown)
 24 state university branch and regional campuses

 46 private colleges and universities
 6 free-standing state-assisted medical schools
 Boonshoft School of Medicine, Wright State University
 Heritage College of Osteopathic Medicine, Ohio University
 Northeast Ohio Medical University
 The Ohio State University College of Medicine and Public Health
 University of Cincinnati College of Medicine
 University of Toledo College of Medicine (formerly Medical University of Ohio)
 15 community colleges
 8 technical colleges
 24 independent non-profit colleges

Libraries

Ohio is home to some of the nation's highest-ranked public libraries. The 2008 study by Thomas J. Hennen Jr. ranked Ohio as number one in a state-by-state comparison. For 2008, 31 of Ohio's library systems were all ranked in the top ten for American cities of their population category.
 500,000 books or more
 Columbus Metropolitan Library (First)
 Cuyahoga County Public Library (Second)
 Public Library of Cincinnati and Hamilton County (Tenth)

The Ohio Public Library Information Network (OPLIN) is an organization that provides Ohio residents with internet access to their 251 public libraries. OPLIN also provides Ohioans with free home access to high-quality, subscription research databases.

Ohio also offers the OhioLINK program, allowing Ohio's libraries (particularly those from colleges and universities) access to materials for the other libraries. The program is largely successful in allowing researchers for access to books and other media that might not be otherwise available.

Culture

Arts

Music

The Rock and Roll Hall of Fame and the Rhythm and Blues Music Hall of Fame are both located in Cleveland. Cleveland disc jockey Alan Freed is credited with coining the term and promoting rock and roll in the early 1950s. Cincinnati is home to the American Classical Music Hall of Fame and Museum.

Popular musicians from Ohio include Mamie Smith, Dean Martin, Dave Grohl, Tyler Joseph and Josh Dun of Twenty One Pilots, Frankie Yankovic, Doris Day, The McGuire Sisters, The Isley Brothers, Bobby Womack, Howard Hewett, Shirley Murdock, Boz Scaggs, John Legend, Marilyn Manson, Nine Inch Nails, Dan Auerbach and Patrick Carney of The Black Keys, Griffin Layne, Joe Dolce, Kid Cudi, Benjamin Orr of The Cars, Chrissie Hynde of The Pretenders, William "Bootsy" Collins, Stephanie Eulinberg of Kid Rock's Twisted Brown Trucker Band, and Devo. Five Ohio musicians  are Rock and Roll Hall of Fame members.

Performing arts

Playhouse Square in downtown Cleveland is the second-largest performing arts center in the United States, home to ten theaters. The Cleveland Orchestra is one of the historic Big Five orchestras in the U.S., and is considered one of the best worldwide.

Many other Ohio cities are home to their own orchestras, including Akron, Blue Ash, Canton, Cincinnati, Columbus, Dayton, Toledo, and Youngstown. Cincinnati is home to its own ballet, symphony orchestra, pops orchestra, and opera, all housed at the Cincinnati Music Hall. Dayton is also home to a ballet, orchestra, and opera, collectively known as the Dayton Performing Arts Alliance.

The Columbus Association for the Performing Arts manages seven historic Columbus area theaters.

Within the marching arts, Winter Guard International has hosted national championships in performing arts at the University of Dayton 18 times between 1983 and 2003, and has permanently since 2005. The Bluecoats Drum and Bugle Corps are Ohio's highest fielding drum corps, competing in the Drum Corps International World Class circuit out of Canton.

Visual arts
Ohio is home to 30 art institutions, including the Columbus Museum of Art, Cincinnati Art Museum, Cleveland Museum of Art, and other entities. The full list includes:

Akron Art Museum, Akron
Allen Memorial Art Museum, Oberlin College
Billy Ireland Cartoon Library & Museum, Ohio State University
Burchfield Homestead, Salem
Butler Institute of American Art, Youngstown
Canton Museum of Art, Canton
Cincinnati Art Museum, Cincinnati
Cleveland Museum of Art, Cleveland
Columbus Museum of Art, Columbus
Contemporary Arts Center, Cincinnati
Dayton Art Institute, Dayton
Frank Museum of Art, Otterbein University
National Imperial Glass Museum, Bellaire
Kennedy Museum of Art, Ohio University
Temple Museum of Religious Art, Case Western Reserve University
Mansfield Art Center, Mansfield
McDonough Museum of Art, Youngstown State University
Miami University Art Museum, Miami University
Museum of Ceramics, East Liverpool
Museum of Contemporary Art Cleveland, Cleveland
Ohio Glass Museum, Lancaster
Richard Ross Museum of Art, Ohio Wesleyan University
Springfield Center for the Arts at Wittenberg University, Wittenberg University
Taft Museum of Art, Cincinnati
Toledo Museum of Art, Toledo
Toy and Plastic Brick Museum, Bellaire
University of Findlay's Mazza Museum, University of Findlay
Wexner Center for the Arts, Ohio State University
Whitby Mansion, Sidney

The Cincinnati Art Museum holds over 100,000 works spanning 6,000 years of human history, being among the most comprehensive collections in the Midwest. Among its notable collections are works by Master of San Baudelio, Jorge Ingles, Sandro Botticelli (Judith with Head of Holofernes), Matteo di Giovanni, Domenico Tintoretto (Portrait of Venetian dux Marino Grimani), Mattia Preti, Bernardo Strozzi, Frans Hals, Bartolomé Esteban Murillo (St. Thomas of Villanueva), Peter Paul Rubens (Samson and Delilah) and Aert van der Neer. The collection also includes works by Jean-Baptiste-Camille Corot, Pierre-Auguste Renoir, Camille Pissarro, Claude Monet (Rocks At Belle Isle), and Pablo Picasso. The museum also has a large collection of paintings by American painter Frank Duveneck (Elizabeth B. Duveneck).

The Cleveland Museum of Art is internationally renowned for its substantial holdings of Asian and Egyptian art, and has a permanent collection of more than 61,000 works from around the world. It is the fourth-wealthiest art museum in the United States.

The Columbus Museum of Art holds nineteenth and early twentieth-century American and European art, including early Cubist paintings by Pablo Picasso and Juan Gris, works by François Boucher, Paul Cézanne, Mary Cassatt, Jean Auguste Dominique Ingres, Edgar Degas, Henri Matisse, Claude Monet, Edward Hopper, and Norman Rockwell, and installations by Mel Chin, Josiah McElheny, Susan Philipsz, and Allan Sekula.

Youngstown's Butler Institute of American Art was the first museum to be dedicated exclusively to American art.

Sports

Professional sports teams

Ohio is home to eight professional sports teams across the five different major leagues in the United States. Current teams include the Cincinnati Reds and Cleveland Guardians of Major League Baseball, the Columbus Crew SC and FC Cincinnati of Major League Soccer, the Cleveland Cavaliers of the National Basketball Association, the Cincinnati Bengals and Cleveland Browns of the National Football League, and the Columbus Blue Jackets of the National Hockey League.

Ohio has brought home seven World Series titles (Reds 1919, 1940, 1975, 1976, 1990; Indians 1920, 1948), two MLS Cups (Crew 2008, 2020), one NBA Championship (Cavaliers 2016), and nine NFL Championships (Pros 1920; Bulldogs 1922, 1923, 1924; Rams 1945; Browns 1950, 1954, 1955, 1964). Despite this success in the NFL in the first half of the 20th century, no Ohio team has won the Super Bowl since its inception in 1967. No Ohio team has made an appearance in the Stanley Cup Finals.

Ohio played a central role in the development of both Major League Baseball and the National Football League. Baseball's first fully professional team, the Cincinnati Red Stockings of 1869, were organized in Ohio. An informal early-20th-century American football association, the Ohio League, was the direct predecessor of the modern NFL, although neither of Ohio's modern NFL franchises trace their roots to an Ohio League club. The NFL itself was founded in Canton, Ohio in 1920 as the American Professional Football Conference. The first official game occurred on October 3, 1920, when the Dayton Triangles beat the Columbus Panhandles 14-0 in Dayton. Canton would later be enshrined as the home of the Pro Football Hall of Fame in 1963.

On a smaller scale, Ohio hosts minor league baseball, arena football, indoor football, mid-level hockey, and lower division soccer.

Individual sports

The Mid-Ohio Sports Car Course has hosted several auto racing championships, including CART World Series, IndyCar Series, NASCAR Nationwide Series, Can-Am, Formula 5000, IMSA GT Championship, American Le Mans Series and Rolex Sports Car Series.
The Grand Prix of Cleveland also hosted CART races from 1982 to 2007. The Eldora Speedway is a major dirt oval that hosts NASCAR Camping World Truck Series, World of Outlaws Sprint Cars and USAC Silver Crown Series races.

Ohio hosts two PGA Tour events, the WGC-Bridgestone Invitational and Memorial Tournament.
The Cincinnati Masters is an ATP World Tour Masters 1000 and WTA Premier 5 tennis tournament.

College sports

Ohio has eight NCAA Division I Football Bowl Subdivision college football teams, divided among three different conferences. It has also experienced considerable success in the secondary and tertiary tiers of college football divisions.

There is only one program in the Power Five conferences, the Ohio State Buckeyes, who play in the Big Ten Conference. The football team is second in all-time winning percentage, with a 931–327–53 overall record and a 25–26 bowl record as of 2020. The program has produced seven Heisman Trophy winners, forty conference titles, and eight undisputed national championships. The men's basketball program has appeared in the NCAA Division I men's basketball tournament 27 times.

In the Group of Five conferences, the Cincinnati Bearcats play as a member of the American Athletic Conference. Their men's basketball team has over 1,800 wins, 33 March Madness appearances, and is currently on a nine-year streak of appearances as of 2019. Six teams are represented in the Mid-American Conference: the Akron Zips, Bowling Green Falcons, Kent State Golden Flashes, Miami RedHawks, Ohio Bobcats and the Toledo Rockets. The MAC headquarters are in Cleveland. The Cincinnati–Miami rivalry game has been played in southwest Ohio every year since 1888 and is the oldest current non-conference NCAA football rivalry.

Other Division I schools, either part of the NCAA Division I Football Championship Subdivision or not fielding in football include the Cleveland State Vikings, Xavier Musketeers, Wright State Raiders, and Youngstown State Penguins. Xavier's men's basketball has performed particularly well, with 27 March Madness appearances. Youngstown State's football has the third most NCAA Division I Football Championship wins, with 3.

There are 12 NCAA Division II universities and 22 NCAA Division III universities in Ohio.

See also

 Index of Ohio-related articles
 Outline of Ohio

Notes

References

Bibliography 
 Profiles of Ohio: history, statistics, demographics for all 1,339 populated places in Ohio, with detailed state and government histories, plus comparative statistics & rankings. (6th ed. Grey House Publishing, 2021). 828pp ISBN 10: 1642658278; covers 88 counties, 248 cities and 689 villages.
 Cayton, Andrew R. L. (2002). Ohio: The History of a People. Columbus, OH: The Ohio State University Press. 
 Kern, Kevin F., and Gregory S. Wilson. (2013) Ohio: A History of the Buckeye State (Wiley-Blackwell, 2013), 544pp
 Knepper, George W. (1989). Ohio and Its People. Kent, OH: Kent State University Press. 
 Holli, Melvin G. (1999). The American Mayor. State College, PA: Pennsylvania State University Press. 
 Roseboom, Eugene H.; Weisenburger, Francis P. (1967). A History of Ohio. Columbus: The Ohio Historical Society.

External links 

 State of Ohio official website
 Ohio State Facts from USDA
 U.S. Census Bureau (Ohio Quick Facts)
 USGS real-time, geographic, and other scientific resources of Ohio
 Thunder in the Heartland: A Chronicle of Outstanding Weather Events in Ohio, by Dr. Thomas Schmidlin and Jeanne Appelhans Schmidlin; The Kent State university Press; Kent, Ohio, 1996. 
 
 

 
States of the United States
Midwestern United States
States and territories established in 1803
Former British colonies and protectorates in the Americas
Former French colonies
1803 establishments in the United States
Contiguous United States